In Norse mythology, Skírnir (Old Norse" ; "bright one") is the god Freyr's messenger and vassal. In the Poetic Edda poem Skírnismál, Skírnir is sent as a messenger to Jötunheimr to conduct lovesick Freyr's wooing of the fair goddess Gerðr on condition of being given Freyr's powerful sword as a reward. The goddess refuses the advances until Skírnir threatens Gerðr with his gambantein, a magic wand. In chapter 34 of the Prose Edda poem Gylfaginning, Skírnir also performs favors for Odin, father of the gods. After the vicious wolf Fenrir evades capture, Skirnir visits the mountain dwarves, known for their mining and smithing. Together they forge the magical restraint Gleipnir for the purpose of binding the wolf. Such undertakings mark Skirnir as a crafty servant.

See also
Skirnir Mountains

Notes

References
Orchard, Andy (1997). Dictionary of Norse Myth and Legend. Cassell. 

Freyr
Servants in Norse mythology